Gianluca Sironi (born 28 June 1974 in Merate) is an Italian former professional racing cyclist.

Major results
1996
 UCI Road World Under–23 Championships
1st  Time trial
3rd  Road race
 1st Raiffeisen Grand Prix
 1st Trofeo Alta Valle Del Tevere
 Giro delle Regioni
1st Stages 3 & 6
 1st Stage 6 Girobio
1998
 2nd Time trial, National Road Championships
 4th Overall Circuit des Mines
2001
 10th Firenze–Pistoia

References

External links

1974 births
Living people
Italian male cyclists
People from Brianza
Cyclists from the Province of Lecco